Children in Need 2005 was a campaign held in the United Kingdom to raise money for the charity Children in Need. It culminated in a live broadcast on BBC One on the evening of Friday 18 November and was hosted by Terry Wogan, Fearne Cotton, Natasha Kaplinsky and, from RAF Brize Norton, Matt Allwright. The voice over was Alan Dedicoat. A total of £17,235,256 was raised by the closing minute.

According to the Broadcasters' Audience Research Board (BARB), overnight ratings suggested that 10.7 million viewers were tuned into BBC One from 9.00pm to 9.15pm (a 45.1% audience share), the slot in which the Doctor Who mini-episode was broadcast in most regions. This represented the highest ratings that Children in Need had received in eight years.

Television campaign

Artist performances 
Girls Aloud performed their song "Biology" on stage at RAF Brize Norton
Katie Melua performed a cover of Canned Heat's 1968 song "On the Road Again"
KT Tunstall performed "Suddenly I See" live from Glasgow
Pussycat Dolls performed their version of "Sway" from the film Shall We Dance?
Madonna performed "Get Together" and "Hung Up"
The Corrs performed "Old Town"

Also appearing were Status Quo, Westlife (live from Belfast), Sugababes (live from Wrexham), Rod Stewart, Craig David, Bryan Adams and Melanie C, and Katherine Jenkins and G4 and ZOO.

Cast performances 
 The cast of Emmerdale performed their version of High Society
 The BBC News team performed their own rendition of Queen's "Bohemian Rhapsody".
 Amy Nuttall sang numbers from My Fair Lady
 The cast of radio soap The Archers performed a live episode on stage.
 The London cast of The Lion King, led by Brown Lindiwe Mkhzi, performed "Circle of Life".
 The cast of Bad Girls performed their version of Elvis Presley's "Jailhouse Rock"
 The cast of Casualty, Elyes Gabel and Luke Bailey performed a rendition of The Beatles  classic I Saw Her Standing There.

Others 
Bruce Forsyth presented a special edition of Strictly Come Dancing called Strictly Tap Dancing.
Lauren Cooper picked a fight with Peggy Mitchell in The Queen Vic in a special EastEnders short starring Catherine Tate, Barbara Windsor, Lacey Turner and Kacey Ainsworth.
David Tennant began his adventures as the Tenth Doctor in a special short episode of Doctor Who also starring Billie Piper.
The premiere of the Texas's promotional video for their song "Sleep" featuring comedian Peter Kay.
Jon Culshaw lampooned Terry Wogan and Prime Minister Tony Blair in a sketch featuring Blair himself making a plea for people to donate.
Kim Medcalf performed a big band version of Soft Cell's "Tainted Love".
Liam Mower performed "Electricity" from Billy Elliot The Musical.
In a UK television première of the illusion, magician Scott Penrose performed The Impossible Sawing, a new "box-less" version of the Sawing a Woman in Half illusion, on host Fearne Cotton.

Official single 
Liberty X recorded the official single for 2005's appeal. The band recorded a cover of Shalamar's 1982 song A Night to Remember for the charity. The single peaked at Number 6 on the UK singles chart.

Totals

See also

References

External links 
 

2005 in the United Kingdom
2005 in British television
2005
November 2005 events in the United Kingdom